Ext2Fsd (short for Ext2 File System Driver) is a free Installable File System driver written in C for the Microsoft Windows operating system family. It facilitates read and write access to the ext2, ext3 and ext4 file systems.

The driver can be installed on Windows 2000, Windows XP, Windows Server 2003, Windows Vista, Windows 7, Windows 8, Windows 10, Windows Server 2008, Windows Server 2008 R2. Support for Windows NT was dropped in version 0.30.

The program Ext2Mgr can optionally be installed additionally to manage drive letters and such. Since 2017 the application has effectively been abandonware as its author seemingly disappeared in August, 2020.

Reception 
The German computer magazine PC-WELT reported frequent program crashes in 2009. The program was not able to access ext3 partitions smoothly. This often led to a blue screen. Crashes of this type can lead to data loss, for example if there is not yet permanently stored data in the main memory. The program could only access ext2 partitions without errors. In 2012, Computerwoche warned that access to ext3 partitions was "not harmless". Data loss may occur.

Features

Feature matrix

Supported Ext3/4 features
 flexible inode size: > 128 bytes, up to block size
 dir_index:    htree directory index
 filetype:     extra file mode in dentry
 large_file:   > 4G files supported
 sparse_super: super block backup in group descriptor
 uninit_bg:    fast fsck and group checksum
 extent:       full support with extending and shrinking.
 journal:      only support replay for internal journal
 flex_bg:      first flexible metadata group
 symlink and hardlink
 Mount-as-user: specified uid/gid supported

Unsupported Ext3/4 features
 64BIT mode (to support 2^64 blocks)
 journal: log-based operations, external journal
 Extended file attributes (EA), Access control list (ACL) support

Features to be implemented in future
 Extents management improvement
 EA and ACL security checking

Critical Bug 

On November 2, 2017, a warning was issued with the release of version 0.69:
Don't use Ext2Fsd 0.68 or earlier versions with latest Ubuntu or Debian systems. Ext2Fsd 0.68 cannot process EXT4 with 64-BIT mode enabled, then it could corrupt your data. Very sorry for this disaster issue, I'm working on an improvement.
While it is not very clear whether v0.69 corrects this deficiency, users have reported  that Windows 10 prompts them to format the ext4 drive even with the  0.69 version. The known solution is to convert the said ext4 drive to a 32 bit version.

See also 

explore2fs
Ext2IFS
GParted
GNOME Disks
dm-crypt
FreeOTFE

References

External links

Old website

Free software programmed in C
Utilities for Windows
Windows disk file systems
Free storage software